6/20/00 – Verona, Italy is a two-disc live album and the nineteenth in a series of 72 live bootlegs released by the American alternative rock band Pearl Jam from the band's 2000 Binaural Tour. It was released along with the other official bootlegs from the European leg of the tour on September 26, 2000.

Overview
The album was recorded on June 20, 2000 in Verona, Italy at the Roman amphitheatre Arena di Verona. It was selected by the band as one of 18 "Ape/Man" shows from the tour, which, according to bassist Jeff Ament, were shows the band found "really exciting." Allmusic gave it two and a half out of a possible five stars. Allmusic staff writer Steven Jacobetz called it "one to get in Pearl Jam's official bootleg series." It debuted at number 134 on the Billboard 200 album chart.

Track listing

Disc one
"Long Road" (Eddie Vedder)  – 5:17
"Grievance" (Vedder)  – 3:13
"Corduroy" (Dave Abbruzzese, Jeff Ament, Stone Gossard, Mike McCready, Vedder)  – 4:42
"Hail, Hail" (Gossard, Vedder, Ament, McCready)  – 3:30
"Animal" (Abbruzzese, Ament, Gossard, McCready, Vedder)  – 2:59
"Nothing as It Seems" (Ament)  – 6:25
"Pilate" (Ament)  – 2:55
"Given to Fly" (McCready, Vedder)  – 3:50
"Even Flow" (Vedder, Gossard)  – 5:52
"MFC" (Vedder)  – 2:32
"Habit" (Vedder)  – 3:34
"Wishlist" (Vedder)  – 3:47
"Daughter" (Abbruzzese, Ament, Gossard, McCready, Vedder)  – 6:08
"State of Love and Trust" (Vedder, McCready, Ament)  – 3:30
"Once" (Vedder, Gossard)  – 3:22
"Lukin" (Vedder)  – 1:03
"Immortality" (Abbruzzese, Ament, Gossard, McCready, Vedder)  – 7:02

Disc two
"Insignificance" (Vedder)  – 4:46
"Rearviewmirror" (Abbruzzese, Ament, Gossard, McCready, Vedder)  – 6:21
"Encore Break"  – 3:12
"In the Colosseum"  – 1:00
"Black" (Vedder, Gossard)  – 6:24
"Breakerfall" (Vedder)  – 2:39
"Do the Evolution" (Gossard, Vedder)  – 4:26
"Elderly Woman Behind the Counter in a Small Town" (Abbruzzese, Ament, Gossard, McCready, Vedder)  – 4:06
"Better Man" (Vedder)  – 3:54
"I Got You" (Neil Finn)  – 4:18
"Alive" (Vedder, Gossard)  – 6:13
"Last Kiss" (Wayne Cochran)  – 3:41
"Porch" (Vedder)  – 6:07
"Soon Forget" (Vedder)  – 2:06
"Yellow Ledbetter" (Ament, McCready, Vedder)  – 6:59

Personnel
Pearl Jam
Jeff Ament – bass guitar, design concept
Matt Cameron – drums
Stone Gossard – guitars
Mike McCready – guitars
Eddie Vedder – vocals, guitars, ukulele

Production
John Burton – engineering
Brett Eliason – mixing
Brad Klausen – design and layout

Chart positions

References

Pearl Jam Official Bootlegs
2000 live albums
Epic Records live albums